Azbizan (also Romanized as Azbīzān and Azbīzan; also known as Azbazān and Azbezān) is a village in Alvir Rural District, Kharqan District, Zarandieh County, Markazi Province, Iran. At the 2006 census, it had a total population of 454, in 134 families.

References 

Populated places in Zarandieh County